Kokish is a community in northern Vancouver Island, British Columbia, Canada, located on the southeast shore of Beaver Cove.  Also on Beaver Cove are the community of Beaver Cove and a former logging camp, Englewood, which is northwest of the mouth of the Kokish River at the head of the cove.

Etymology
Kokish is an adaptation of k'wagis, meaning "notched beach", the name of a former village at the mouth of the river.  Another meaning given by artist and chief Mungo Martin is that Kokish is a corruption of the Kwak'wala word, Gwegis, for "place where river spreads".

See also
List of settlements in British Columbia

References

Northern Vancouver Island
Unincorporated settlements in British Columbia